EChO - Eradicate Childhood Obesity Foundation, Inc. is a 501(c)(3) public charity based in Cambridge, MA dedicated to ending childhood obesity. Established in 2015, the foundation aims to promote healthier lifestyles through the use of nutrition education, technology, and novel, easy-to-understand food labels.

History 
Founder and President Laurent Adamowicz established EChO - Eradicate Childhood Obesity Foundation, Inc. in 2015 with researchers and public health advocates Dr. George Blackburn, Dr. Steven Heymsfield, Eric Rimm, and Pastor Raymond Jetson. The foundation aims to create innovative solutions to combat childhood obesity and help children build healthier lives by spreading awareness of the dangers of added sugar consumption. Adamowicz and Jetson are 2011 Senior Fellows of the Advanced Leadership Initiative at Harvard University. Since its establishment, EChO has created initiatives focused on decreasing the consumption of processed foods containing added sugars, a proven contributor to childhood obesity. In 2019, EChO became a partner of the National Salt and Sugar Reduction Initiative (NSSRI).

Board of Directors and Executives 
 Dr. George L. Blackburn, director (2015-2017)
 Dr. Steven Heymsfield, director
 Kathy McManus, director
 Raymond Jetson, vice president, director
 Laurent Adamowicz, president and founder

The Added Sugar Repository 

The Added Sugar Repository (ASR) was launched by EChO as an open source, collaborative project in 2018. The ASR is an exhaustive list that aims to contain all names of added sugar that are found to be used in food and beverage products throughout the United States. The repository was made to allow consumers to have information on what is added sugar and the different forms used by the food industry. The Added Sugar Repository is supported by Robert Lustig and his Sugar Project.

SugAR Poke 

In June 2017, EChO- Eradicate Childhood Obesity Foundation, Inc. partnered with Pandora Reality to release a novel diet app, "SugAR Poke", free on iPhone and Android. SugAR Poke is the first public health app to utilize augmented reality (AR) technology, helping consumers make healthier food choices with better knowledge of added sugar. The demo app scans front labels of popular salad dressings to provide consumers with real-time added sugar content by superimposing an added-sugar front label on the bottle A green label means that there is no added sugar in the product. A black label appears over the product if it contains added sugar, displaying the number of teaspoons of added sugar in the entire bottle.

Founder and President Laurent Adamowicz introduced SugAR Poke at the AR in Action Conference at New York University, followed by the launch of a Kickstarter campaign to allow for full development of the app. Eventually, the fully developed app will include all processed foods sold in the United States and a gaming component to better educate children on the dangers of added sugar.

Other Initiatives

Added Sugar Front Label Initiative and Study 
The Added Sugar Front Label Initiative proposes added sugar front labels displaying the quantity of added sugar in processed goods. This aims to decrease consumption of added sugar and prevent childhood obesity. A research component to the initiative will pilot-test added sugar labels to prove the ability to influence food-purchasing behavior via a large-scale study conducted at food retailers and/or public school vending machines in the Boston/Cambridge, Massachusetts area.

Principal Investigators for Added Sugar Front Label Study 
 Rania Mekary, MSc, Ph.D.
 Christina A. Roberto, Ph.D.

Universal Cooking and Nutrition Education (U-CANE) 
EChO - Eradicate Childhood Obesity Foundation, Inc. is an avid promoter of cooking and nutrition education for all, especially children. EChO launched the Universal Cooking and Nutrition Education (U-CANE) movement to encourage the U.S. public school system to reform their curriculum to include mandatory cooking and nutrition classes from kindergarten to medical school.

References 

501(c)(3) organizations